Fossil is a city in and the county seat of Wheeler County, Oregon, United States. The name was chosen by the first postmaster, Thomas B. Hoover, who had found some fossil remains on his ranch. The population was 473 at the 2010 census.

History 
The Fossil post office was established on February 28, 1876, on Thomas Benton Hoover's ranch along Hoover Creek. He named the place Fossil after finding fossils in a clay-like rock formation on his ranch. In 1881, Hoover and Thomas Watson opened a store near the confluence of Butte and Cottonwood creeks and moved the post office to the store. When the city was incorporated in 1891, Hoover became the first mayor.

After creating Wheeler County in 1899, the Oregon Legislature chose Fossil as the temporary county seat. A county-wide election held in 1900 to determine the permanent county seat yielded 436 votes for Fossil, 267 for Twickenham, and 82 for Spray.

Winlock W. Steiwer and George S. Carpenter founded Steiwer & Carpenter Bank, the first bank in the city and the county. By the early 20th century in addition to the bank, Fossil had a flour mill, a blacksmith shop, a drug store, a jewelry and optical store, a livery stable, and three stores with general merchandise. In the 1920s, William Jennings Bryan was one of the guest speakers at a Chautauqua meeting in Fossil. Later in the decade the John Day Valley Coal & Oil Company drilled an exploratory oil well within the city limits, but it was not successful.

Geography and climate
Fossil is the county seat of Wheeler County.

Fossil is located in north-central Oregon at the intersection of Oregon Route 19 with Oregon Route 218. Butte Creek, a tributary of the John Day River, flows through the city. By highway, Bend, to the southwest, is about a two-hour drive from Fossil, and Portland, to the west, is about a three-hour drive.

The average wettest month is December. According to the Köppen climate classification system, Fossil has a warm-summer Mediterranean climate (Köppen Csb).

Demographics

As of the census of 2010, there were 473 people, 224 households, and 124 families residing in the city. The racial makeup of the city was 92.4% White, 2.7% Native American, 0.8% Asian, 0.8% from other races, and 3.2% from two or more races. Hispanic or Latino of any race were 2.3% of the population.

There were 224 households, of which 18.8% had children under the age of 18 living with them, 43.3% were married couples living together, 9.4% had a female householder with no husband present, 2.7% had a male householder with no wife present, and 44.6% were non-families. 40.2% of all households were made up of individuals, and 22.3% had someone living alone who was 65 years of age or older. The average household size was 2.04 and the average family size was 2.75.

The median age in the city was 56.1 years. 18.6% of residents were under the age of 18; 4.7% were between the ages of 18 and 24; 14.2% were from 25 to 44; 30.5% were from 45 to 64; and 32.1% were 65 years of age or older. The gender makeup of the city was 49.0% male and 51.0% female.

At the 2000 census, the median income for a household in the city was $30,250, and the median income for a family was $37,125. Males had a median income of $29,688 versus $20,893 for females. The per capita income for the city was $16,236. About 12.0% of families and 12.0% of the population were below the poverty line, including 9.2% of those under age 18 and 3.3% of those age 65 or over.

Arts and culture

Annual events
During the second weekend in August, Fossil hosts the Wheeler County Fair and Rodeo; on the first weekend of July the Wheeler County Bluegrass Festival is held on the courthouse lawn.
For more than 30 years, the American Bikers Aimed Toward Education (ABATE) of Oregon has held motorcycle rallies in the area in late May. Golf tournaments are held each year at a six-hole golf course at Kinzua, near Fossil.

Museums and other points of interest
Fossil is the site of the only public fossil field in Oregon. The field is located behind Wheeler High School, where fossils of animals and plants such as the Metasequoia can be found. After the initial discovery of the fossil field in 1949 or 1950, access was free and unrestricted until 2005, when a small interpretive center was constructed, and a collection limit of three fossils was established in exchange for a $3 entry fee. The basic entry fee per person in 2011 is $5.

The Oregon Paleolands Institute (OPLI) headquarters and exhibition hall are in Fossil, near the courthouse. OPLI is an educational, community-based non-profit that offers tours, hikes, and workshops related to the region's geology and paleontology.

Education
It is in the Fossil School District 21J. Wheeler High School and Fossil Elementary School are in Fossil. In the 2011−12 school year, about 50 students were enrolled in grades 7 through 12 and about 35 in kindergarten through grade 6.

The county is not a part of a community college district.

Notable people
 Bill Bowerman, coach and founder of Nike, Inc. resided in Fossil prior to his death

See also
Thomas Benton Hoover House

References

External links
Entry for Fossil in the Oregon Blue Book

Cities in Oregon
County seats in Oregon
Cities in Wheeler County, Oregon
1876 establishments in Oregon
Populated places established in 1876